The Marshall Mountains are a group of mountains overlooking Beardmore Glacier in the Queen Alexandra Range, Antarctica. They are bounded on the north by Berwick Glacier, and on the south by Swinford Glacier. The mountains were discovered by the South Polar Party of the British Antarctic Expedition (1907–09), and named for Dr. Eric Marshall, surgeon and cartographer to the expedition, a member of the Polar Party.

Mountains
Blizzard Peak, at 3,375 metres (11,070 ft), the highest peak in the Marshall Mountains
Mayeda Peak, at 2,890 metres (9,480 ft) high, in the Marshall Mountains
Storm Peak, standing 3.5 nautical miles (6 km) north of Blizzard Peak in the Marshall Mountains

References

External links

Mountain ranges of the Ross Dependency
Shackleton Coast